Siota is a region on the north side of Nggela Island at the western end of Utuhu Passage in the Central Province of Solomon Islands, a state in the southwest Pacific Ocean:

References

External links
 Mission House in 1906
 St Luke's Anglican Cathedral, Siota

Populated places in Central Province (Solomon Islands)